Kashish Singh is an Indian actress and a model. She has appeared in a couple of regional films and is on the verge of making her Bollywood debut.

Early life and modelling career
She was born and brought up in Delhi. Her father is a businessman and her mother is a social worker. She was educated at Delhi Public School and went on to Delhi University 

Kashish completed her acting course from Anupam Kher’s acting academy, Actor Prepares. She went on to feature in various print ads for big brands like Stayfree, Dabur, Fair & Lovely, Siemens, and many more. Kashish has also modelled for Domestic and International Fashion Catalogues.

Acting career

Early work
In July 2012, she featured in the promotional song of the Punjabi movie, Carry On Jatta. She made her feature film debut with Yaarana opposite Yuvraj Hans. Her next success was Vipin Parashar's Punjabi movie Saadey CM Saab opposite Harbhajan Mann.

Upcoming projects
She has been signed by Tips Industries.

Magazine covers
Kashish Singh has graced several magazine covers like Filmfare in January 2014, Stuff in March 2014, and Femina in May 2014.

Interests
Kashish is reported to be a style diva, a youth icon and to be involved in charity work.

Sports ventures
Kashish Singh co-owns the Pro Wrestling League franchise team Jaipur Ninjas.

Filmography

References

External links 

Indian film actresses
21st-century Indian actresses
Actresses from Delhi
Female models from Delhi
Living people
Year of birth missing (living people)